William Henry Ford Cogan PC (1823 – 28 September 1894) was an Irish Whig (and later Liberal) politician. He was Member of Parliament (MP) for Kildare from 1852 to 1880, representing the county in the United Kingdom House of Commons.

Cogan was first elected to the Parliament at a by-election on 13 March 1852, when he was returned unopposed after the Conservative MP Lord Naas was appointed as Chief Secretary for Ireland. He was re-elected at the general election in July 1852, when Kildare's two Whig MPs secured a large majority over a lone Conservative challenger. He was then returned unopposed in four successive general elections, and held the seat in 1874 against a strong challenge from Home Rule League candidates, one of whom defeated his fellow Liberal MP Lord Otho FitzGerald. He did not contest the 1880 general election, when Home Rulers took both seats in Kildare.

Cogan was the last Whig or Liberal MP returned for County Kildare. After his retirement in 1880, all further MPs for the county were Irish nationalists of various parties, until and Sinn Féin from 1918 until Irish representation at Westminster ended in 1922 with the foundation of the Irish Free State.

Arms

References

External links 
 

1823 births
1894 deaths
UK MPs 1847–1852
UK MPs 1852–1857
UK MPs 1857–1859
UK MPs 1859–1865
UK MPs 1865–1868
UK MPs 1868–1874
UK MPs 1874–1880
Members of the Parliament of the United Kingdom for County Kildare constituencies (1801–1922)
Irish Liberal Party MPs
Members of the Privy Council of Ireland